The following is a list of cities in Mayotte:

Acoua
Bandraboua
Bandrele
Bouéni
Chiconi
Chirongui
Dembéni
Dzaoudzi
Kani-Kéli				
Koungou
Longoni
Mamoudzou
Mtsamboro
M'Tsangamouji
Ouangani
Pamandzi				
Sada
Tsingoni

See also 
 Communes of Mayotte
 Islands of Mayotte

Mayotte
 
Cities